Ding Dong is an unincorporated community in Central Texas. According to the Handbook of Texas, it had a population of 22 in 2000. It is located within the Killeen–Temple–Fort Hood metropolitan area.

History
In the early 1930s, a man named Zulis Bell and his nephew Bert Bell operated a country store along the Lampasas River in central Texas in an area that was known as McBryde Crossing. They hired the artist C.C. Hoover to make a sign for it. The finished sign had two bells on it with the name Zulis in one and Bert in the other. The bells were reported to have been requested by Dallas newspaper columnist Frank X. Tolbert, in which they were brought to the community from the Atchison, Topeka and Santa Fe Railway in 1962. Weighing 200 lbs., it was given to the "mayor" of the community, Charlie Hold, by two of the railroad's vice presidents and took over the Bells' store in 1950. In addition to the bells, Hoover lettered the words, Ding Dong. As the community grew around the country store, it took on the name 'Ding Dong'. It is said that the community first came to the country's attention from Ripley's Believe It or Not! when travel writer Bill Bryson mentioned it in his book, Made in America and Gary Gladstone mentioned it in Passing Gas: And Other Towns Along The American Highway with a photograph of carpet salesman and fire chief Harold Rowe posing in front of his fire truck. The Killeen Lions Club International tried to secure Ding Dong as the site of the district convention in 1964. The community had a church and several scattered homes in 1979 and 22 residents from 1990 through 2000. This community has frequently been noted on lists of unusual place names.

Geography

Education
Ding Dong is served by the Killeen Independent School District.

Notable person
 Sons of the Pioneers fiddler Hugh Farr was born in Ding Dong.

References

Unincorporated communities in Bell County, Texas
Unincorporated communities in Texas
Killeen–Temple–Fort Hood metropolitan area